Strawpeople are a New Zealand band. They were created by Paul Casserly and Mark Tierney after they had met while working at the Auckland university radio station now known as 95 bFM.

Over the years, Strawpeople has brought together various New Zealand songwriters, vocalists and musicians in a collaborative effort and achieved some success. The album Broadcast reached number seven on the New Zealand charts and stayed in the top 40 for 51 consecutive weeks. Single "Sweet Disorder" from that album won the 1995 APRA Silver Scroll Award as well as the 'Songwriting' trophy at the 1996 New Zealand Music Awards. "Sweet Disorder" was voted one of the APRA Top 100 New Zealand Songs of All Time, and was included on the related Nature's Best 2 CD. Their fourth album Vicarious became their most commercially successful album, climbing to number four on the New Zealand albums chart and winning "Album of the Year" at the 1997 New Zealand Music Awards. In 2000, the band had their highest-charting single in New Zealand when their cover of The Cars' "Drive", featuring vocals from fellow New Zealand musician Bic Runga, reached number seven on the New Zealand Singles Chart.

Many albums also featured other covers of songs such as John Hiatt's Have a Little Faith in Me and The Church's Under the Milky Way.

Vocalists
The Strawpeople, being a studio based recording outfit, have had a revolving door lineup of vocalists, normally female and from New Zealand. Notable vocalists include Leza Corban, Stephanie Tauevihi, Fiona McDonald (a vocalist from New Zealand band The Headless Chickens).

Discography

Albums

Singles

References

External links
 

APRA Award winners
Musical groups from Auckland
New Zealand electronic music groups
Electronic music duos